Harry S. Truman (1884–1972) was the president of the United States from 1945 to 1953.

Harry Truman may also refer to:

Places
 Harry S Truman State Park, Truman Lake, Osage River, Missouri, USA
 Harry S. Truman Reservoir, Osage River, Missouri, USA
 Harry S. Truman Historic District, Independence, Missouri, USA

Facilities and structures
 Harry S Truman Building, Washington, D.C., USA; the headquarters of the Department of State
 Harry S Truman Airport, St. Thomas, U.S. Virgin Islands
 Harry S. Truman Bridge, Missouri River, Missouri, USA
 Harry S. Truman Parkway, Savannah, Georgia, USA
 Harry S. Truman Memorial Veterans' Hospital, Columbia, Missouri, USA
 Harry S. Truman College, Chicago, Illinois, USA
 Harry S Truman High School (disambiguation)

Music
 "Harry Truman" (song), a 1975 song by Chicago from Chicago VIII
 "Harry Truman", a song by Headgear
 "Harry Truman", a song by Mindless Self Indulgence from Frankenstein Girls Will Seem Strangely Sexy

Other uses
 Harry R. Truman (1896–1980), victim of the eruption of Mount St. Helens
 Harry Truman Day, 8th of May
 USS Harry S. Truman, a Nimitz-class super-carrier of the United States Navy
 Harry S Truman School of Public Affairs, University of Missouri
 Harry S. Truman: A Life (book), 1994 biography about the U.S. president
 Harry S. Truman (Twin Peaks), a character on Twin Peaks

See also

 Presidency of Harry S. Truman, his presidency

Truman (disambiguation)
Harry (disambiguation)

Truman, Harry